The 8th Lancers was (until 1922) one of the 39 cavalry regiments of the British Indian Army. It had originally been part of the army of the East India Company before passing into the reorganised Bengal Army of the post-Mutiny period and ultimately into the unified Indian Army of 1904. As the 3rd Cavalry it is now part of the modern Indian Army.

Origin and history 

The 8th Lancers were the last cavalry regiment to be established before the Great Mutiny of 1857, being raised by Captain W. H. Ryves at Sultanpore in 1846. The regiment served in Peshawar in 1857 and in the 2nd Afghan War. They were issued with lances in 1899 to become the 8th Bengal Lancers, later changed to the 8th Lancers.

As the 8th Cavalry the regiment spent World War I on internal security duties in India although it was sent to Palestine in 1920. On returning to India in 1921 they were amalgamated with the 5th Cavalry and renamed the 3rd Cavalry.

Titles 

Like all regiments of the Indian Army, the 8th Lancers underwent many name changes in the various reorganisations. They are listed below.

1846 17th Irregular Cavalry
1847 18th Irregular Cavalry
1861 8th Regiment of Bengal Cavalry
1900 8th Regiment of Bengal Lancers
1901 8th Bengal Lancers
1903 8th Lancers
1904 8th Cavalry
1922 3rd Cavalry following amalgamation with the 5th Cavalry

References 
Kempton, C (1996). A Register of Titles of the Units of the H.E.I.C. & Indian Armies 1666-1947. Bristol: British Empire & Commonwealth Museum. 
Gaylor, J (1992). Sons of John Company: The Indian and Pakistan Armies 1903- 1991. Stroud: Spellmount Publishers Ltd. 

Military units and formations established in 1846
British Indian Army cavalry regiments
Honourable East India Company regiments
Indian World War I regiments
1846 establishments in British India